Cyperus pubens is a species of sedge that is native to Tanzania, Malawi, Zambia and Zimbabwe in southern tropical Africa.

The species was first formally described by the botanist Georg Kükenthal in 1931.

See also
 List of Cyperus species

References

pubens
Taxa named by Georg Kükenthal
Plants described in 1931
Flora of Tanzania
Flora of Zimbabwe
Flora of Malawi
Flora of Zambia